Fractional crystallization may refer to:

 Fractional crystallization (chemistry), a process to separate different solutes from a solution
 Fractional crystallization (geology), a natural process occurring in igneous rocks during which precipitation of minerals takes place